Brent Forrester is an American writer and producer, who has written for 6 Emmy Award-winning television comedies. He wrote several episodes of the animated television sitcom The Simpsons between 1993 and 1997. He has worked as a writer on The Ben Stiller Show, Mr. Show with Bob and David, Undeclared, Super Fun Night and The Office. He served as head writer and executive producer on King of the Hill, Love, The Office and Space Force. Forrester has also written feature films.

Early life
Forrester, the son of physician James S. Forrester, grew up as a surfer in Malibu, CA. As an undergraduate John Jay Scholar at Columbia University he worked on the university's student TV station, and returned to Los Angeles to begin a career as a TV writer. At Columbia, he roomed with future Chattanooga mayor Tim Kelly in Carman Hall.

Career
Forrester wrote for The Simpsons between 1993 and 1997. He wrote the episodes: "Homer vs. Patty and Selma", "Lemon of Troy", the Krusty Burger segment of "22 Short Films About Springfield", and "Homerpalooza". "Homerpalooza" was based on a story by David X. Cohen, although Forrester wrote the script. To do research for the episode, Forrester went to one of the Lollapalooza concerts, which ended up being a horrible experience. Several of the jokes in the episode are based on his experiences: cameras (including his own) were being seized and thrown in the garbage, there were numerous advertisements, several "sour faced teens", a real freak show and at one point a stranger approached Forrester and asked "how's it going, nark?"

Forrester has also served as executive producer on King of the Hill, and written for The Ben Stiller Show, Mr. Show with Bob and David and Undeclared. He served as a writer and consulting producer on The Office. He has written seven episodes of the show including "The Merger" and "Business School" and directed the episode "Casual Friday". He also directed a 2008 series of webisodes of the show, and wrote the NBC.com web series In Gayle We Trust.

He also wrote the screenplay for the 1996 film The Stupids. Forrester is writing the film The Low Self Esteem of Lizzie Gillespie with Mindy Kaling, and a sitcom pilot for Ron Howard.

Forrester also voiced Leon the Drug Addict in the episode of King of the Hill "Junkie Business".

In May 2012, he became an executive producer for the final season of The Office. In 2014, Netflix announced a two-season comedy series entitled Love co-created by director Judd Apatow, Paul Rust, and Lesley Arfin, with Forrester as executive producer. In 2019–2020 Forrester is executive producer of Space Force directed by Greg Daniels and starring Steve Carell.

Writing credits

The Simpsons written episodes 
Forrester has written (or co-written) the following episodes:

"Homer vs. Patty and Selma" (February 26, 1995)
"Lemon of Troy" (May 14, 1995)
"22 Short Films About Springfield" [contributor] (April 14, 1996)
"Homerpalooza" (May 19, 1996)

Mr. Show written episodes 
Forrester has co-written (with Dino Stamatopoulos) the following sketches from the following episodes:

"The Return of the Curse of the Creature's Ghost" (December 5, 1997) [sketch: "Pre-Taped Call-In Show"]
"Rudy Will Await Your Foundation" (November 9, 1998) [sketch: "Audition"]

Undeclared written episode 
Forrester co-wrote (with Judd Apatow) the following episode:

"The Perfect Date" (February 19, 2002)

The Office written episodes 
Forrester has written or co-written the following episodes:

"The Merger" (November 16, 2006) - Season 3
"Business School" (February 15, 2007) - Season 3
"Product Recall" co-written with Justin Spitzer (April 26, 2007) - Season 3
"Did I Stutter?" co-written with Justin Spitzer (May 1, 2008) - Season 4
"Business Trip" (November 13, 2008) - Season 5
"Blood Drive" (March 5, 2009) - Season 5
"Mafia" (October 15, 2009) - Season 6
"New Leads" (March 18, 2010) - Season 6
"The Search" (February 3, 2011) - Season 7
"Work Bus" (October 18, 2012) - Season 9
"A.A.R.M." (May 9, 2013) - Season 9

Love written episodes 
Forrester has written or co-written the following episodes:

"One Long Day" (February 19, 2016) - with Lesley Arfin and Paul Rust
"The Table Read" (February 19, 2016)

Directing credits

The Office directed episodes 
Forrester has directed the following episodes:
"Casual Friday" (April 30, 2009) - Season 5
"New Leads" (March 18, 2010) - Season 6
"Test the Store" (March 1, 2012) - Season 8
"The Target" (November 29, 2012) - Season 9

References

External links
Brent Forrester's Official Website

20th-century American writers
21st-century American writers
American television producers
Columbia College (New York) alumni
American television writers
Emmy Award winners
Living people
American male television writers
Showrunners
Writers Guild of America Award winners
20th-century American male writers
Year of birth missing (living people)